Shahrixon is a city in Andijan Region, Uzbekistan. It is the administrative center of Shahrixon District. Its population was 45,200 in 1989, and 71,400 in 2016.

References

 

Populated places in Andijan Region
Cities in Uzbekistan